In molecular biology, the F-actin capping protein is a protein complex which binds in a calcium-independent manner to the fast-growing ends of actin filaments (barbed end), thereby blocking the exchange of subunits at these ends. Unlike gelsolin and severin this protein does not sever actin filaments. The F-actin capping protein is a heterodimer composed of two unrelated subunits: alpha and beta. Neither of the subunits shows sequence similarity to other filament-capping proteins. The alpha subunit is a protein of about 268 to 286 amino acid residues and the beta subunit is approximately 280 amino acids, their sequences are well conserved in eukaryotic species.

The actin filament system, a prominent part of the cytoskeleton in eukaryotic cells, is both a static structure and a dynamic network that can undergo rearrangements: it is thought to be involved in processes such as cell movement and phagocytosis, as well as muscle contraction.

References

Protein families